Russia 1985–1999: TraumaZone (subtitled in promotional media as What It Felt Like to Live Through The Collapse of Communism and Democracy) is a seven-part BBC documentary television series created by Adam Curtis. It was released on BBC iPlayer on 13 October 2022.

Background 
Previously unused archival footage of the Soviet Union and Russia from the BBC's Moscow bureau was unearthed and digitised by a BBC employee Phil Goodwin. Adam Curtis appeared to be the only person within the BBC interested in using the footage. In a departure from his usual style, Curtis opted not to use voiceovers or non-diegetic music, with the only commentary made via on-screen captions. Curtis, in a piece in The Guardian, explained this choice was because the footage was "so strong that I didn’t want to intrude pointlessly, but rather let viewers simply experience what was happening". In an interview with Meduza, Curtis stated that Leo Tolstoy's War and Peace served as an inspiration for him as "it appeals to my collage mind".

Premise
Using stock footage shot by the BBC, the series chronicles the collapse of the Soviet Union, the rise of capitalist Russia and its oligarchs, and the effects of this on Russian people of all levels of society, leading to the rise to power of Vladimir Putin.

Episodes

Critical reception
The Guardian gave the series five stars, calling it "ingenious, essential viewing". Writing for the Financial Times, Dan Einav said "Russia 1985–1999 TraumaZone is unmistakably an Adam Curtis documentary. And an exceptional one at that."

References

Further reading 
Can't Get You Out of My Head
HyperNormalisation

External links
 
 

2022 British television series debuts
2022 British television series endings
2020s British documentary television series
BBC television documentaries
English-language television shows
Films directed by Adam Curtis
Documentary films about the Soviet Union
Documentary films about Russia